Jawor  is a town in south-western Poland with 22,890 inhabitants (2019). It is situated in the Lower Silesian Voivodeship (from 1975 to 1998 it was in the former Legnica Voivodeship). Through the town flows the 31 mile long Raging Nysa river (pl: Nysa Szalona)

A Protestant Church of Peace can be found in the town. It was named a UNESCO World Heritage Site in 2001. Jawor Castle lies in the town.

History
The name of the city Jawor comes from the Polish word for "sycamore". The earliest recorded name dates from 1133 when the city was written down as Jawr and in 1203 as Jawor. Till 16th century the name was written down in Latin in various forms such as: Iavor, Iavr, Javr, Javor, Jaur, Jaura, Jawer, Jauor. Polish form Jawor was continued to be used, for example in painting from 1562 located in church of St.Martin. Other form Iawor is recorded in document from 1248 and in document from 1277 the name Iaver is used. In 1295 in the Latin work Liber fundationis episcopatus Vratislaviensis city is noted as Jawor. In the 1475 Latin Statuta Synodalia Episcoporum Wratislaviensium, which also contains the oldest Polish-language printing, as Jaworensis.

The German name Jauer is a Germanized version of the original Slavic name, and by 1750 Polish name Jawor was still used in Polish by Prussian authorities. The German name became official after 1763 and Prussian-Austro war.

Jawor was the main stronghold of the Trzebowianie tribe, one of the Polish tribes, and became part of the emerging Polish state in the 10th century. According to medieval chronicles the settlement was expanded in the 11th century. It was granted town rights between 1242 and 1275. As a result of the fragmentation of Poland, Jawor became part of the Duchy of Silesia, then the Duchy of Legnica from 1248, and from 1274 it was the capital of the Duchy of Jawor, the southwesternmost duchy of medieval Poland, before being integrated with the Duchy of Świdnica in 1346, part of which it remained until 1392, all the time remaining under the founding dynasty of the Piasts. By the end of the 13th century, stone defensive walls were erected. Between 1279 and 1334 the St. Martin church was built and in 1311 the St. Barbara church was renovated. Churches of St. Martin and St. Barbara are the oldest churches in Jawor. In 1324 the first hospital was founded. The first known image of the coat of arms of Jawor, preserved on the city seal comes from 1300. Jawor has grown into one of the most important centers of weaving in Lower Silesia. In 1329 Jawor was granted staple right by Duke Henry I of Jawor. In the 14th century, the first guilds were founded, bringing together furriers, tailors, clothiers and merchants.

After losing the town by Poland, it was then ruled by Bohemia, Hungary, Bohemia again and Austria. The town suffered during the Thirty Years' War (1618–1648) as a result of repeated invasions, occupations, religious persecutions and epidemics. In 1626 it was plundered by the Austrians, in 1633 briefly occupied by Saxony and recaptured by Austria, in 1639 occupied by the Swedes and in 1640 recaptured by Austria, in 1642 occupied by the Swedes, then the Austrians and again the Swedes, finally captured in 1648 by the Austrians, who plundered and burned the town and expelled its inhabitants. After the war, in accordance to the Peace of Westphalia, the so-called Church of Peace was built, however, the Protestants were still being discriminated against by the Austrian administration.

In the 18th century, the town and region was the subject of Austrian-Prussian wars, eventually passing to Prussia in 1763. The Prussians turned the Piast Castle into a prison. In 1776 the town suffered a fire. On 14 May 1807, during the Napoleonic Wars and Polish national liberation struggles, Polish troops marched through the town, the day before they fought the victorious battle of Struga against the more numerous Prussians. In 1871 along with Prussia the town became part of Germany, and remained within until 1945. During World War II the Germans imprisoned French and Norwegian women in the castle, participants of anti-German resistance movements. In the final stages of the war, in early 1945, most of the town's population was evacuated by the Germans. It was captured by the Soviets in February and passed to Poland in April. After the war the region officially became part of Poland again as per the Potsdam Agreement. Also according to the agreement, the Germans who had not already fled, were expelled and Polish citizens, many of whom had been expelled from the Polish areas annexed by the Soviet Union, became the majority.

The surname "Jaworski," meaning someone whose ancestors had ties to Jawor, is a fairly common surname both in Poland itself, and among Polish emigres to countries such as the United States. Examples include Leon Jaworski and Ron Jaworski.

Notable people
 Nicholas Magni (1355–1435), theologian
 Christoff Rudolff (1499–1545), author of the first German textbook on algebra
 Heinrich Gottfried von Mattuschka (1734–1779), German botanist
 Wilhelm Ebstein (1836-1912), doctor who described the heart disorder Ebstein's anomaly
 Gerhard Bersu (1889–1964), German archeologist
 Max Otto Koischwitz (1902–1944), Nazi propagandist
 Heinz Finke (1920–1996), German officer
 Janusz Krasoń (born 1956), Polish politician
 Elżbieta Witek (born 1957), Polish politician, Marshal of Sejm (since 2019)
 Aleksander Śliwka, (born 1995), Polish volleyball player

Twin towns – sister cities

Jawor is twinned with:

 Berdychiv, Ukraine
 Niepołomice, Poland
 Niesky, Germany
 Roseto degli Abruzzi, Italy
 Turnov, Czech Republic

Sights
 Church of Peace, a UNESCO World Heritage Site and Historic Monument of Poland
 Jawor Castle, former residence of local Piast dukes
 Gothic-Renaissance St. Martin church
 Regional Museum (Muzeum Regionalne) located in the former Bernardine monastery
 Town Hall
 Medieval town walls
 Strzegomska Tower
 Municipal Theatre (Teatr Miejski)
 St. Adalbert chapel
 St. Barbara church
 Former Beguine monastery and church

References

External links
 Official site
 Local flags 
 Jewish Community in Jawor on Virtual Shtetl
 Church Of Peace in Jawor - photo gallery

 
Cities and towns in Lower Silesian Voivodeship
Jawor County
Cities in Silesia